Idiochelys is a genus of Late Jurassic turtle from marine deposits in the Jura Mountains of eastern France and Bavaria, Germany.

Idiochelys wagneri, Chelonemys plana, and Chelonemys ovata are junior synonyms, the latter two being described from specimens in the Ain Department of southeastern France. Distinguishing features of Idiochelys include an oval/rounded carapace, broad vertebrals, a long tail, and a reduced manual phalangeal formula (2-2-3-3-3).

References 

Thalassochelydia
Prehistoric turtle genera
Kimmeridgian genera
Tithonian genera
Late Jurassic turtles
Late Jurassic reptiles of Europe
Jurassic France
Fossils of France
Jurassic Germany
Fossils of Germany
Fossil taxa described in 1839
Taxa named by Christian Erich Hermann von Meyer